Sir Harold Alfred MacMichael  (15 October 1882 – 19 September 1969) was a British colonial administrator who served as High Commissioner for Palestine.

Early life and career
Educated at Bedford School, MacMichael graduated with a first from Magdalene College, Cambridge. After passing his civil service exam, he entered the Sudan Political Service in Anglo-Egyptian Sudan. He then served in the Blue Nile Province until 1915, when he became a senior inspector of Khartoum Province. He rose to the position of civil secretary in 1926. In 1933, he became governor of Tanganyika until 1937.

High Commissioner of Palestine
The next year, he became High Commissioner of the British Mandate of Palestine and was blamed for sending at least 768 Jewish refugees aboard MV Struma to their deaths. During his tenure, MacMichael was the target of seven unsuccessful assassination attempts, mainly by the Lehi Group (the Stern Gang). In the last, both he and his wife narrowly escaped death in an ambush that the Stern Gang had mounted on 8 August 1944, on the eve of his replacement as High Commissioner.

MacMichael also served a stint as High Commissioner of Malta.

Malayan Union
The British Military Administration had set to task of reviving pre-war plans for centralised control over the Malay states within days after British Allied forces landed in Singapore on 5 September 1945.

MacMichael, who had completed his stint as High Commissioner of the British Mandate of Palestine, was empowered to sign official treaties with the Malay rulers over the Malayan Union proposal scheme. MacMichael made several visits to the Malay rulers, beginning with Sultan Ibrahim of Johor in October 1945. The Sultan quickly consented to MacMichael's proposal scheme, which was motivated by his strong desire to visit England at the end of the year. MacMichael paid further visits to other Malay rulers over the proposal and sought their consent over the proposal scheme. Many Malay rulers expressed strong reluctance in signing the treaties with MacMichael, partly because they feared the loss of their royal status and the prospect of their states falling into Thai political influence.

It has to be mentioned that the Sultans signed under duress. The British were intent on securing their agreement and were willing to depose of any disagreeing Sultan if necessary. That all of the Malay Sultans signed with so little resistance can be attributed to a rather simple ploy by the British. They were privately told that if they resisted, an inquiry would be held into their relations, conduct and collaboration with the Japanese occupation during the war. The sitting rulers, many of whom were concerned that both their offices and social positions would be destroyed, quickly complied. Later, when their positions were confirmed and secure, many would complain that the they had not been given the opportunity to consult with their state councils nor with each other. In the words of the Sultan of Kedah, "I was presented with a verbal ultimatum and a time limit, and in the event of my refusing to sign the new agreement,... a successor who would sign would be appointed".

The treaties provided that the British had full administrative powers over the Malay states except in areas pertaining to Islamic customs. The Malays strongly protested the treaties, which had the effect of circumscribing the spiritual and moral authority of the Malay rulers over which the Malays held high esteem. Communal tensions between the Malays and the Chinese were high, and the prospect of granting citizenship to non-Malays was deemed unacceptable to the Malays.

Opposition to the Malayan Union and MacMichael's perceived highhanded ways in getting the Malay rulers consent led to the birth of Malay nationalism in British Malaya.

Family
MacMichael's daughter, Araminta, married the politician and business leader Toby Low, 1st Baron Aldington. His other daughter, Priscilla, married James Raynes, a US Navy officer.

References

External links
 
 

1882 births
1969 deaths
Alumni of Magdalene College, Cambridge
People educated at Bedford School
Anti-Zionism in Mandatory Palestine
British High Commissioners of Palestine
Colonial Administrative Service officers
Governors of Tanganyika (territory)
Companions of the Distinguished Service Order
Knights Grand Cross of the Order of St Michael and St George
Mandatory Palestine people of World War II
Sudan Political Service officers